Kim Min-sun may refer to:

 Kim Gyu-ri (actress, born August 1979), Korean actress (her previous name)
 Kim Min-sun (speed skater) (born 1999), Korean speed skater